Derwent Tower was a 29-storey residential apartment building in Dunston, Tyne and Wear, United Kingdom, opened in 1972.  Due to its unusual shape it was nicknamed the "Dunston Rocket" during construction (even before its official Derwent Tower title) and the name remained with locals throughout its life.  It was demolished in 2012.

The tower was designed by the Owen Luder Partnership on behalf of Whickham Council, which controlled the Dunston area of Gateshead. The original brief was for three high-rise blocks of at least 22 storeys, but due to adverse ground conditions on site the decision was made to build one tower, with the rest being low-rise blocks of two to five storeys. Despite the architect's advice against construction of a high-rise building on the site, the council were strongly in favour. Following many consultations and explanatory models of the foundations with specialists, construction of the foundations began in February 1968, and the tower was completed in March 1971.

Construction was complex because of the very poor ground conditions. The foundations were based on a sunken concrete caisson that was built above ground then sunk over a period of time. Caisson foundations are often found in harbour construction; being used in the 1960s for a local authority tower block was a first, and the caisson became an underground garage area for residents.

The tower had a very bold and striking appearance, unlike any other tower block or high rise building in the UK. It was of a Brutalist design with many design similarities with Gateshead's "Get Carter car park" also a product of the Owen Luder Partnership. The tower housed two-bedroom flats up to the 10th floor and one-bedroom flats on floors 11 to 29. It featured in a 1970s advert for Tudor Crisps.

Unusual features were:

 Height 85 m (280 ft)
 Unusual construction methods
 Plan form change between 10th and 11th floor to accommodate building services including two 10,000-gallon water tanks
 Flying buttresses from the ground to 5th floor assisting the foundations
 Unusual foundations including an underground spiral carpark (closed to residents for many years, due to repeated flooding.)
 Brutalist form
 Exposed elements of structure and services, i.e. flying buttresses from floor level and exposed water tanks.

The tower was in desperate need of refurbishment for many years, making it unpopular with residents and locals. It had been allowed to fall into a run-down state through neglect and lack of maintenance. Services breakdowns, lift failures, water supply faults were all common but were unlikely to be a result of the tower's design or construction methods. In 2007 Gateshead Council decided to relocate residents amid health and safety concerns over the already poor and deteriorating services.

On 17 August 2009 the tower failed in gaining listed status on the grounds of it being a non-listable building. In January 2012 demolition began, completed in September 2012.

References

Buildings and structures in Gateshead
Brutalist architecture in England
Residential skyscrapers in England
Residential buildings in England
Demolished buildings and structures in England
Residential buildings completed in 1972
Buildings and structures demolished in 2012
1972 establishments in England
2012 disestablishments in England
Former skyscrapers